Wangcheng may refer to the following places in China:

Wangcheng (Zhou dynasty), an ancient settlement from the Eastern Zhou period, located near modern Luoyang, Henan
Wangcheng District, a district of Changsha, Hunan
Wangcheng Economic and Technological Development Zone, in Wangcheng District

Towns
Wangcheng, Hubei (王城), in Zaoyang, Hubei
Wangcheng, Jiangxi (望城), in Nanchang, Jiangxi

Subdistricts
Wangcheng Subdistrict, Lu'an (望城街道), in Jin'an District, Lu'an, Anhui
Wangcheng Subdistrict, Linli County, in Linli County, Hunan
Wangcheng Subdistrict, Laixi (望城街道), in Laixi, Shandong

See also
Wang Cheng (died 1200), Song dynasty historian and author of Dongdu Shilüe
Wancheng (disambiguation)
Wangchang (disambiguation)